Neopodocotyle is a genus of trematodes in the family Opecoelidae.

Species
Neopodocotyle gorakhpurensis Agarwal & Kumar, 1986
Neopodocotyle indica Dayal, 1950
Neopodocotyle kulpaharensis Agarwal & Agarwal, 1980
Neopodocotyle lucknowensis Gupta & Chakrabarti, 1967
Neopodocotyle mehrai Rai, 1971
Neopodocotyle spinipora Sircar & Sinha, 1969

References

Opecoelidae
Plagiorchiida genera